Bruce was a provincial riding in Ontario, Canada, that was created for the 1934 election. It was merged into Grey-Bruce prior to the 1967 election but was recreated in 1987. It was abolished a second time prior to the 1999 election. It was merged into the riding of Bruce—Grey.

Members of Provincial Parliament

References

Notes

Citations

Former provincial electoral districts of Ontario